The 2nd Guards Infantry Division (German: 2. Garde-Infanterie-Division) was a unit in the Guards Corps of the Imperial German Army during the First World War. At the outbreak of war it was commanded by Lieutenant General  Arnold von Winckler.

Order of battle: 1914
 3rd Guards Infantry Brigade
 4th Guards Infantry Brigade
 2nd Guards Field Artillery Brigade
 2nd Guards Uhlans (1st, 3rd, 4th and 5th Squadrons)
 2nd and 3rd Company, Guards Pioneer Battalion
 2nd Section, Guards Field Ambulance Company

References 

Infantry divisions of Germany in World War I